Live on Tour in the Far East Vol. 2 is a live album led by saxophonist Billy Harper recorded in 1991 in Taiwan and released on the SteepleChase label. The album was the second of three volumes recorded on the same tour.

Reception 

In his review for AllMusic, Don Snowden states "It's just exceptional jazz that constantly engages the listener, following its own flow and internal logic and continually changing up on your expectations...which is a pretty good basic blueprint of what all great jazz should strive for".

Track listing 
All compositions by Billy Harper except as indicated
 "Priestess" - 17:39
 "Trying to Make Heaven My Home" - 25:52
 "My Funny Valentine" (Lorenz Hart, Richard Rodgers) - 9:12
 "Destiny Is Yours" - 12:35

Personnel 
 Billy Harper - tenor saxophone
  Eddie Henderson - trumpet
 Francesca Tanksley - piano
 Louie Spears - bass
 Newman Taylor Baker - drums

References 

1993 live albums
Billy Harper live albums
SteepleChase Records live albums